Dustin Whitney Manwaring is an American attorney and politician serving as a Republican member of the Idaho House of Representatives.

Early life and education
Manwaring was raised in Blackfoot, Idaho, and graduated from Blackfoot High School. He earned a Bachelor of Science from the University of Utah and a Juris Doctor from Drake University School of Law.

Career 
Manwaring practices law in Pocatello, Idaho, assists clients with business and intellectual property issues in both California and Idaho. Previously he worked for SkyWest Airlines, Mitt Romney's 2008 and 2012 presidential campaigns, the Iowa Republican Party, and as a law clerk for the United States Attorney for the Southern District of Iowa. Manwaring has argued cases before the Idaho Supreme Court and the Bankruptcy Appellate Panel for the Ninth Circuit.

Idaho House of Representatives 
After Idaho Representative Mark Nye announced his candidacy for the Idaho Senate, Manwaring subsequently announced his candidacy for the Idaho House of Representatives seat held by Nye. He was unopposed in the 2016 Republican primary and defeated Pocatello attorney David Maguire in the 2016 general election. Manwaring was the only Republican serving in Legislative District 29 from 2016 to 2018 and again from 2020 to 2022, when Manwaring won re-election for the 29th district against Chris Abernathy.

In 2017, Manwaring was nominated by the speaker of the Idaho House of Representatives to participate in NCSL's Emerging Leaders Symposium hosted at the PayPal headquarters in San Jose, California.

On January 6, 2018, Manwaring was recognized by the Idaho Young Republicans as the 2017 Elected Official of the Year.

In April 2018, Manwaring was selected to attend the State Legislative Leaders Foundation Emerging Leaders Program for up to 50 of the best and brightest state legislators from across the nation held at the University of Virginia, in partnership with the Darden School of Business.

In August 2018, Manwaring participated in a 12-day political exchange program to New Zealand as a delegate on a trip organized by the American Council of Young Political Leaders (ACYPL). The exchange was arranged by ACYPL in partnership with the New Zealand Parliament, and made possible by a grant from the United States Department of State Bureau of Educational and Cultural Affairs.

In June 2021, Manwaring was appointed to serve on the Workforce Development Committee of the Council of State Governments West (CSG West). On July 30, 2021, Manwaring was appointed by Governor Brad Little to serve on the State of Idaho's inaugural Cybersecurity Task Force.

Elections

References

External links
 Dustin Manwaring at the Idaho Legislature

21st-century American politicians
Idaho lawyers
Living people
Republican Party members of the Idaho House of Representatives
People from Blackfoot, Idaho
People from Pocatello, Idaho
University of Utah alumni
Year of birth missing (living people)
Drake University Law School alumni